The City God Temple or Temple of the City Gods (Shanghainese: Zånhae Zenwånmio), officially the City Temple of Shanghai, is a folk temple located in the old city of Shanghai. It commemorates the elevation of Shanghai to municipal status and is the site of the veneration of three Chinese figures honored as the city gods of the town. It is also known by some locals as the "Old City God Temple", in reference to a later "New City God Temple" which no longer exists.

History

Regardless of size, many walled cities in ancient China contained a temple dedicated to one or more immortal or god as the spirit(s) or protector(s) of the city.

The City God Temple in Shanghai originated as the Jinshan God Temple, dedicated to the spirit of Jinshan, or "Gold Mountain", an island off the coast of Shanghai. It was converted into a City God Temple in 1403, during the Yongle Emperor era.

Residents of the old city as well as nearby areas visited the temple to pray for good fortune and peace. The temple reached its largest extent in the Daoguang era. The popularity of the temple also led to many businesses being set up in the area, turning the surrounding streets into a busy marketplace.

During the Cultural Revolution, the temple was closed down and used for other purposes. For many years, the main hall was used as a jewellery shop.

In 1951, the Board of Trustees of the City God Temple was dissolved, and the temple was handed over to the Shanghai Taoist Association and made into a Taoist center. The institution made changes to the temple, removing statues representing folk underworld personalities such as Yama, the judge of the dead, and placing an emphasis on Taoist spirituality instead.

In 1994, the temple was restored to its former use as a temple, with resident Taoist priests. The Temple, together with nearby and the surrounding streets, are now part of a large pedestrian zone dedicated to restaurants and retail.

A complete restoration of the City God Temple took place between 2005 and 2006. In October 2006 the place of worship was reopened and reconsecrated by Taoist clergymen.

New City God Temple

During the Sino-Japanese War, the old city was occupied by the Japanese while, initially, they left the foreign concessions alone. As a result, worshippers from the concessions were cut off from the temple. As a response, local merchants built a new temple and attached a market place near what is today Yan'an Road and Jinling Road, in the Shanghai International Settlement. This was known as the "New City God Temple". After the end of World War II, the New City God Temple waned in popularity as worshippers shifted back to the Old City God Temple. The new temple and markets were demolished in 1972.  However, the "New City God Temple" remains in use referring to the locality around the site of that temple.

See also

 Tutelary deity

References

Citations

Bibliography
Shanghai Local History Office. 老城隍庙 (Old City God Temple). Shanghai Tong. Accessed 13 May 2007.

External links

Official website 
City God Temple (Chenghuangmiao)
City God Temple

Culture in Shanghai
Huangpu District, Shanghai
Landmarks in Shanghai
Religious buildings and structures in Shanghai
Religion in Shanghai
Taoist temples in Shanghai
Tourist attractions in Shanghai